Villavelayo is a village in the province and autonomous community of La Rioja, Spain.

Politics

References

Populated places in La Rioja (Spain)